The Arizona State Sun Devils softball program is a college softball team that represents Arizona State University in the Pac-12 Conference in the National Collegiate Athletic Association. The team has had 6 head coaches since it started playing organized softball in the 1967 season. The current coach is Megan Bartlett, who took over the head coaching position in 2023.

Key

Coaches

Notes

References

Lists of college softball head coaches in the United States

Arizona State Sun Devils softball coaches